The 2021–22 season was Al-Ittihad's 46th consecutive season in the top flight of Saudi football and 94th year in existence as a football club. The club participated in the Pro League, the King Cup, and the Arab Club Champions Cup. The club will not compete in the 2022 AFC Champions League after failing to obtain an AFC license.

The season covered the period from 1 July 2021 to 30 June 2022.

Players

Squad information

Out on loan

Transfers and loans

Transfers in

Loans in

Transfers out

Loans out

Pre-season

Competitions

Overview

Goalscorers

Last Updated: 23 June 2022

Assists

Last Updated: 23 June 2022

Clean sheets

Last Updated: 27 June 2022

References

Ittihad FC seasons
Ittihad